Hollies Sing Dylan is a 1969 cover album featuring songs written by Bob Dylan and performed by the Hollies. It is their eighth UK album. It was also released in the US as Words and Music by Bob Dylan with a different cover but using the same band image and track order. First released on compact disc in West Germany in the late 1980s, it was not released in that format in the rest of Europe until 1993. For this issue, two bonus tracks, the single version of "Blowin' in the Wind" and a live version of "The Times They Are a-Changin'". A later remastered issue in 1999 added a third bonus track, a live version of "Blowin' in the Wind".

Background
The album was recorded and released following Graham Nash's departure from the band to join David Crosby and Stephen Stills in December 1968 after early sessions for a follow-up to the psychedelic concept album, Butterfly, broke down. Nash became frustrated when the other band members showed opposition to lyrics in his latest compositions. By that time, Nash was the only member of the band using LSD and marijuana and a rift was forming between him and his beer drinking bandmates:

Nash quickly became disillusioned with the direction that the band was moving artistically and especially derided their decision to record an entire album of covers:

Nash has claimed in interviews that he sang on the version of "Blowing in the Wind", and indeed, a TV appearance of the band playing the song with Nash from late 1968 exists (One of the last TV shows he did with the band). However, his name does not appear on the album credits.

There have been claims that the album was hated by fans and critics alike. However it peaked at no. 3 in the UK, their third highest showing for any LP and second-highest charting for one with newly recorded material. Nevertheless, the group's next album was titled Hollies Sing Hollies in an apparent move to placate critics. In an interview for Billboard magazine in 1974, Clarke reflected on the album:

This is the first album with new member Terry Sylvester, who replaced Nash.

Track listing
All songs written and composed by Bob Dylan, except "This Wheel's on Fire" composed by Dylan and Rick Danko.

Side one
"When the Ship Comes In" – 2:40
"I'll Be Your Baby Tonight" – 3:24
"I Want You" – 2:09
"This Wheel's on Fire" – 2:52
"I Shall Be Released" – 3:20
"Blowin' in the Wind" – 4:06

Side two
"Quit Your Low Down Ways" – 2:40
"Just Like a Woman" – 3:57
"The Times They Are a-Changin'" – 3:15
"All I Really Want to Do" – 2:19
"My Back Pages" – 2:55
"Mighty Quinn" – 2:24

Personnel
As listed in liner notes.
The Hollies
Bernard Calvert – bass guitar, piano, organ, keyboards
Allan Clarke – vocals, harmonica
Bobby Elliott – drums, percussion
Tony Hicks – vocals, lead guitar, banjo
Terry Sylvester – vocals, rhythm guitar

String arrangements and composing on "Blowin' in the Wind" by Mike Vickers. All other strings arranged and conducted by Lew Warburton.

See also
List of songs written by Bob Dylan
List of artists who have covered Bob Dylan songs

References

1969 albums
The Hollies albums
Albums produced by Ron Richards (producer)
Bob Dylan tribute albums
Parlophone albums
Covers albums